
Gmina Frysztak is a rural gmina (administrative district) in Strzyżów County, Subcarpathian Voivodeship, in south-eastern Poland.

The gmina contains part of the protected area called Czarnorzeki-Strzyżów Landscape Park.

Villages
Gmina Frysztak contains the villages and settlements of Chytrówka, Cieszyna, Frysztak, Glinik Dolny, Glinik Górny, Glinik Średni, Gogołów, Huta Gogołowska, Kobyle, Lubla, Pułanki, Stępina, Twierdza and Widacz.

Neighbouring gminas
Gmina Frysztak is bordered by the gminas of Brzostek, Jasło, Kołaczyce, Wielopole Skrzyńskie, Wiśniowa and Wojaszówka.

References

Polish official population figures 2006

Frysztak
Strzyżów County